We Are Boyfriend is the first special compilation album by South Korean boy band  Boyfriend to be released in Japan. The album consists of their past three Korean Singles in 2011. The album was released digitally on June 6, 2012.

Background and promotion 
Boyfriend's Japanese agency, Being Group, said they are sure that the group will be successful in the Japanese market with their refined appearance and music.
Boyfriend received as much money as other K-pop stars by signing the contract but the exact amount is unknown.

Boyfriend's album We Are Boyfriend also ranked on the same chart, coming in at 6th.

Boyfriend’s agency Starship Entertainment revealed on June 20 that the Japanese version of “We Are Boyfriend” released on June 6 as a prelude to their official Japanese debut had reached number 1 on the Oricon weekly Foreign Music Chart.

We Are Boyfriend is a package of three singles that have been previously released in Korea.

Track listing

Charts

Album chart

References 

2012 albums
Boyfriend (band) albums
Being Inc. albums
Starship Entertainment albums